Ojuelegba may refer to:

"Ojuelegba" (song), 2014 song by Wizkid
Ojuelegba, Lagos, a suburb of Lagos, Nigeria